Aero O/Y is the original name of Finnair, the national airline of Finland.

16 November 1927: An Aero O/Y Junkers F 13 disappeared en route from Tallinn to Helsinki. The aircraft was carrying two Finnish officers and the pilot. The pilot probably got lost, landed on water and sank.

9 October 1935: An Aero O/Y Junkers F 13ge (OH-ALI, Papagei) crashed in the Gulf of Finland after descending too low due to poor visibility, killing all six on board.

10 November 1937: An Aero O/Y Junkers Ju 52 nose engine dropped off into the sea during a scheduled flight from Turku to Stockholm. The pilots managed to land safely with the two remaining engines. A broken propeller blade had caused a severe imbalance tearing the engine off its mounting.

14 June 1940:  Flight 1631, a Junkers Ju 52/3mge named Kaleva flying from Tallinn to Helsinki, was shot down by two Soviet Air Force Ilyushin DB-3F bombers over the Gulf of Finland. At that time there was no war between the Soviet Union and Finland. Among the passengers were the French diplomatic couriers Paul Longuet and Frederic Marty and US courier Henry Antheil from the US embassy in Helsinki. The Soviet Union had declared an embargo on Estonia on 9 June 1940, and the Soviet Air Force was ordered to prevent Estonian or Latvian air force flights to Finland or Sweden. Various theories for the shootdown have been presented, one being that the Soviet Union wanted to get hold of the diplomatic mail that was transported in the aircraft, and subsequently picked up by a Soviet submarine which was operating in the area at the time of the downing.

7 November 1941: An Aero Junkers Ju 52/3mce floatplane (OH-LAK, Sampo) made an emergency landing in the sea after all three engines had failed due to problems with fuel quality. Two people (of 16 on board) drowned while trying to swim to safety. The aircraft was later repaired.

31 October 1945: An Aero Junkers Ju 52/3mce aircraft approached Hyvinkää in poor weather. Radio signals were distorted by high voltage overhead wires and the plane descended below minimum altitude and crashed into a forest. All 14 persons on board survived, but the aircraft was written off.

3 January 1961: Aero Flight 311, a DC-3 that was being flown by alcohol-intoxicated and sleep-deprived pilots crashed in Kvevlax, Finland (Koivulahti in Finnish), with the loss of all 25 on board. The accident remains the deadliest in Finnish aviation history.

8 November 1963: Aero Flight 217, a DC-3 crash that was attributed to a malfunction of the captain's altimeter, during a non-precision approach to Mariehamn, Åland with poor visibility. Of the 25 on board, only 3 survived. Two of the survivors walked away from the wreck before rescuers arrived. The main wreckage was located 1,200 m from the runway, with parts scattered over a large area in the forest. ILS equipment had been ordered for the airport, but local land use disputes had prevented an installation. The flight departed Turku in violation of regulations regarding such a poor visibility at the destination. While the plane was tracking the localizer course to the runway, it descended prematurely and collided with a knoll, short of the runway.

References 

 
Aviation accidents and incidents in Finland